Anil Menon is an Indian writer of speculative fiction, as well as a computer scientist with a Ph.D. from Syracuse University, who has authored research papers and edited books on Evolutionary Algorithms. His research addressed the mathematical foundations of replicator systems, majorization, and reconstruction of probabilistic databases, in collaboration with professors Kishan Mehrotra, Chilukuri Mohan, and Sanjay Ranka. After working for several years as a computer scientist, he started to write fiction. His short stories and reviews have appeared in the anthology series Exotic Gothic, Strange Horizons, Interzone, Lady Churchill's Rosebud Wristlet, Chiaroscuro, Sybil's Garage, Apex Digest, and others. 

In 2009, Zubaan Books, India's leading feminist press, published his debut young adult novel The Beast With Nine Billion Feet. It was shortlisted for the 2010 Vodafone Crossword Book Award. In 2009, in conjunction with Vandana Singh and Suchitra Mathur, he helped organize India's first in-residence, three-week speculative fiction workshop at IIT-Kanpur.

Works

Short fiction
 "Love In A Hot Climate" in Tel: Stories (ed. Jay Lake), Wheatland Press, 2005. .
 "Archipelago" in Strange Horizons Magazine, April 2005. Shortlisted: 2006 Carl Brandon Society Parallax Award.
 "Eustace Albert" in Time For Bedlam (ed. Roger Arbuckle), Saltboy Publishers, 2005. .
 "Standard Deviation" in Chiaroscuro Magazine, March 2005. Reprinted in Kalkion Magazine, July 2010. Honorable Mention: Year's Best Fantasy & Horror (ed. Ellen Datlow), 2006.
 "Dialetheia" in New Genre Magazine, Issue No. 5, Spring 2007.
 "Invisible Hand" in Lady Churchill's Rosebud Wristlet, No. 20, June 2007.
 "A Sky Full Of Constants" in Albedo One, Issue 33, 2007.
 "Vermillion" in Internova Magazine, Issue 10, January 2007.
 "Harris On The Pig: Practical Hints For The Pig-Farmer" in From The Trenches (ed. J. P. Haines & S. Henderson), Carnifax Press, 2006. . Reprinted in Apex Magazine, December 2008.
 "Into The Night" in Interzone, January 2008. Reprinted in The Apex Book Of World SF (ed. Lavie Tidhar), 2008. Reprinted Apex Digest, November 2008. Reprinted Galaxies, January 2010.
 "The Scorching Glass" in Return of the Raven (ed. Maria Grazia Cavicchiolli), 2009.
 "The Poincaré Sutra" in Sybil's Garage, Issue 7, 2011. Nominated for the 2010 Carl Brandon Society Parallax Award and the Carl Brandon Society Kindred Award.
 "The Uncertain Hour" in The Tangled Bank: Love, Wonder, and Evolution (ed. Chris Lynch), February 2011.
 "Haveli" in Exotic Gothic 5, Vol. II (ed. Danel Olson), PS Publishing, 2012.

Children's fiction
 "Ice" in Shockwave & Other Cyber Stories (ed. Vatsala Kaul),  Penguin Books, India, 2007. .
 "Before and After" in Dignity Dialogue, August 2010.
 "Shrieknath" in Whispers in the Classroom, Voices on the Field (ed. Richa Jha), July 2011. 
 "A Different Ballgame" in Sports Stories (ed. Himanjali Sankar), Scholastic India, 2011.
 "No More", Hoot Magazine, July 2011.

Novels
 The Beast with Nine Billion Feet, Zubaan Publishers (India), 2009, . Shortlisted for the 2010 Vodafone-Crossword Award.

Anthologies
 Breaking the Bow: Speculative Fiction Inspired by the Ramayana (eds. Anil Menon & Vandana Singh), Zubaan Books, December 2011.

Articles
"Hunting a Snark: On the Trail of Regional Indian SF". Translated by: Juan Madrigal, Literatura Prospectiva5 May 2010.
"World Building in a Hot Climate", World SF Blog Editorial, 19 May 2010
"The Raw and the Cooked", World SF Blog Editorial, 25 November 2009.

Interviews
 SF-Signal Interview 2 Nov. 2009.
 Hindustan Times, Interview by Sumeet Kaul, 6 Dec. 2009.
 The Hindu, Kochi Metroplus, Interview by Prema Manmadhan, 15 January 2010.
 Kalkion Online Interview by Swapnil Bhartiya, 15 February 2010.
 Sanskrit Literature Blog, Interview by Venetia Ansell, 4 March 2010.
 OPEN Magazine: Changing Epic Traditions, Interview by Sudha G. Tilak, 2 August 2010.
 NRK (Norwegian Broadcasting Corporation), Interview by Ana Leticia Sigvartsen, 16 June 2011.

References

External links

Living people
Writers from Pune
English-language writers from India
Indian science fiction writers
Novelists from Kerala
Indian male novelists
20th-century Indian novelists
20th-century Indian male writers
Year of birth missing (living people)